Naoko Shimazu is a professor in the Department of History, Classics and Archaeology at Birkbeck College, University of London. She is a Fernand Braudel fellow at the European University Institute. Her research interests are the "cultural history of international diplomacy, social and cultural history of modern societies at war, and new approaches to the study of empire". Shimazu is a fellow of the Royal Historical Society.

Education
Shimazu has the following degrees:
1985 B.A.(Honours) in political studies, University of Manitoba
1987 M.Phil. in international relations, University of Oxford
1995 D.Phil. in international relations, University of Oxford

Selected publications
Japan, Race and Equality: The Racial Equality Proposal of 1919. Routledge, London, 1998.
Nationalisms in Japan. Routledge, London, 2006. (editor)
Japanese Society at War: Death, Memory, and the Russo-Japanese War. Cambridge University Press, Cambridge, 2009.
Imagining Japan in Postwar East Asia. Routledge, London, 2013. (Co-editor with Paul Morris and Edward Vickers)

References

External links 
Naoko Shimazu on the Fukushima nuclear disaster. The Guardian.
Full text of doctoral thesis, "The racial equality proposal at the 1919 Paris Peace Conference: Japanese motivations and anglo-american responses" via the Oxford Research Archive

Living people
Year of birth missing (living people)
Academics of Birkbeck, University of London
University of Manitoba alumni
Alumni of the University of Oxford
Fellows of the Royal Historical Society
Fernand Braudel Fellows